Secret File is a 2003  Italian historical drama film written and directed by Paolo Benvenuti.

It depicts a fictional investigation about the Portella della Ginestra massacre. It was entered into the main competition at the 60th Venice International Film Festival.

Cast

Cast    
David Coco as  Gaspare Pisciotta
Antonio Catania as  The Lawyer
Sergio Graziani as  The Professor 
Aldo Puglisi as  Perito Settore
Francesco Guzzo as  Cacaova

See also
 List of Italian films of 2003

References

External links

Italian drama films
2003 drama films
2003 films
Italian films based on actual events
Films set in Sicily
Films directed by Paolo Benvenuti
Films about the Sicilian Mafia
2000s Italian films
Fandango (Italian company) films